Bergsson is an Icelandic patrynomic surname. Notable people with the surname include:

 Nikolás Bergsson, Icelandic traveller
 Guðbergur Bergsson (born 1932), Icelandic writer
 Guðni Bergsson (born 1965), Icelandic football player

See also
 Bergson (surname)